Year 1424 (MCDXXIV) was a leap year starting on Saturday (link will display the full calendar) of the Julian calendar.

Events 
 January–December 
 June 2 – Battle of L'Aquila: Jacopo Caldora and Micheletto Attendolo, for the Kingdom of Naples, defeat Braccio da Montone, for Alfonso V of Aragon.
 August 17 – Battle of Verneuil: An English force under John, Duke of Bedford defeats a larger French army under the Duke of Alençon, John Stewart, and Earl Archibald of Douglas. Alençon is captured and Douglas killed.

 Date unknown 
 Dalmatia: Aliota Capenna, lord of Lesina (nowadays Hvar), offers his realm to the Republic of Venice (also said to have occurred in 1409 and 1421).

Births 
 January 1 – Louis IV, Elector Palatine (1436–1449) (d. 1449)
 June 9 – Blanche II of Navarre (d. 1464)
 August – Demetrios Chalkokondyles, Greek scholar (d. 1511)
 October 31 – King Władysław III of Poland (d. 1444)
 December 8 – Anselm Adornes, Merchant, politician and diplomat (d. 1483)
 December 25 – Margaret Stewart, Dauphine of France (d. 1445)
 August 10 or 1426 – Boniface III, Marquess of Montferrat (d. 1494)
 date unknown – Abu Sa'id Mirza, ruler of Persia and Afghanistan (d. 1469)

Deaths 
 January 4 – Muzio Sforza, Italian condottiero
 January 8 – Stephen Zaccaria, Latin Archbishop of Patras
 April 14 – Lucia Visconti, English countess (b. 1372)
 May 10 – Emperor Go-Kameyama of Japan
 June 5 – Braccio da Montone, Italian condottiero
 June 10 – Duke Ernest of Austria (b. 1377)
 June 16 – Johannes Ambundii, Archbishop of Riga
 August 12 – Yongle Emperor of China (b. 1360)
 August 17 – John Stewart, Earl of Buchan (b. c. 1381)
 September 17 – Catherine, Princess of Asturias, Austrian royal (b. 1422)
 October 11 – Jan Žižka, Czech general and Hussite leader
 date unknown –  Joan II, Countess of Auvergne  (b. 1378)
 probable – Johannes Abezier, provost and bishop of the Teutonic Knights (b. 1380)

References